The prime minister of the Sahrawi Arab Democratic Republic is the head of government of the Sahrawi Arab Democratic Republic (SADR), a government in exile based in the Sahrawi refugee camps of Tindouf, Algeria. The post of the prime minister has been held by Bouchraya Hammoudi Bayoun since 13 January 2020.

Prime ministers of the Sahrawi Arab Democratic Republic (1976–present)

Timeline

See also

History of Western Sahara
List of colonial governors of Spanish Sahara
President of the Sahrawi Arab Democratic Republic

References

External links
World Statesmen - Western Sahara

 
Government of the Sahrawi Arab Democratic Republic
Politics of Western Sahara